Ayshath Zeenath Beevi, known professionally as just Ayesha, is an Indian actress who primarily appears in Tamil language films and TV series. She began her TV career in Tamil through Ponmagal Vanthal in 2018. She later appeared in the critically acclaimed TV serial Sathya (TV series) which aired on Zee Tamil. She also played a supporting role in the 2019 film Dhilluku Dhuddu 2.

Early life

Ayesha was born in Kasaragod, Kerala, India into a Malayalam speaking family where her father spoke Tamil and her mother spoke Malayalam. She completed her schooling in Ambedkar Vidhyanikethan English Medium Higher Secondary School, Kasaragod. Then she came to Chennai for college and graduated from M.O.P. Vaishnav College for Women in the stream of Bsc.

Career
Once during her college days, Ayesha participated in the reality show "Ready Steady Po" which aired on Star Vijay in 2017 officially debuting her career. Then she appeared in her first debut serial in Tamil Ponmagal Vanthal where she played the role of Rohini. She later appeared as the main and lead character in the TV serial Sathya (TV series)  playing the role Sathya. The serial later became critically acclaimed and liked among fans and viewers. She later appeared as a contestant in the fashion-reality show Super Queen which also aired on Zee Tamil where she emerged as the 2nd runner up of the show.
She appeared in Bigg Boss Tamil Season 6.

Media
In 2020, Ayesha was ranked at number 6th position for 10 Most Desirable Women of Tamil TV by The Times of India.

Controversy
In Bigg Boss Season 6 – Tamil, Ayesha had a controversy for replying back aggressively and arrogantly at host Kamal Haasan on national television.

Television

Filmography

Films

Awards

References

External links 

Living people
Actresses in Tamil television
Actresses in Telugu television
Year of birth missing (living people)
Actresses in Tamil cinema
21st-century Indian actresses
Indian television actresses
Actresses from Kerala
Bigg Boss (Tamil TV series) contestants